The Men's 4×100 Freestyle Relay event at the 2005 FINA World Aquatics Championships was swum on July 24, 2005 in Montreal, Quebec, Canada. 24 teams swam in preliminary heats in the day's morning session, with the top-8 teams from the prelims advancing to swim again in the final heat in the day's evening session.

At the start of the event, the existing World (WR) and Championships (CR) records were:
WR: 3:13.17,  South Africa (Schoeman, Ferns, Townsend, Neethling), swum August 15, 2004 in Athens, Greece
CR: 3:14.06,  Russia  (Kapralov, Usov, Pimankov, Popov), swum July 20, 2003 in Barcelona, Spain

Results

Final

Preliminaries

References

External links
Start List: Men's 4×100m Freestyle Relay at the 2005 FINA World Championships. Published by OmegaTiming.com; retrieved 2011-08-09.
World Champs, Day 1 Night Session: United States Regains Glory in Men's 400 Freestyle Relay, Swimming World Magazine (2005-07-24); retrieved 2011-08-09.

Swimming at the 2005 World Aquatics Championships